Sugarloaf is a summit in Herkimer County, New York and partly in Hamilton County, New York in the Adirondack Mountains. It is located southeast of Little Rapids in the Town of Webb. Mount Tom is located north-northwest of Sugarloaf.

References

Mountains of Herkimer County, New York
Mountains of New York (state)
Mountains of Hamilton County, New York